Yuki Muroya (室谷 由紀 Muroya Yuki, born March 6, 1993) is a Japanese women's professional shogi player ranked 3-dan.

Women's shogi professional

Promotion history
Muroya's promotion history is as follows.
 3-kyū: October 1, 2009
 2-kyū: July 17, 2010
 1-kyū: July 17, 2010
 1-dan: April 1, 2011
 2-dan: August 25, 2015
 3-dan: December 27, 2019

Note: All ranks are women's professional ranks.

Titles and other championships
Muroya has appeared in major titles match five times, but has yet to win a major title. She was the challenger for the 9th  title in 2016, the 24th and 26th  titles in 2016 and 2018, the 46th Women's Meijin title in 2020 and the 42nd  title also in 2020.

Awards and honors
Muroya received the Japan Shogi Association's "Women's Professional" and "Women's Professional Most Games Played" Annual Shogi Awards for the April 2015March 2016 shogi year, and the "Women's Professional Most Games Played" award for the April 2016March 2017 shogi year.

Personal life
In March 2018, Muroya announced that she had gotten married on her 25th birthday and would be competing under her married name Taniguchi (谷口).

In February 2020, Muroya announced she had divorced and would return to using Muroya as her name.

Muroya remarried in January 2021, but this time decided to keep competing under her maiden name.

References

External links
 ShogiHub: Muroya, Yuki
 

Japanese shogi players
Living people
Women's professional shogi players
Professional shogi players from Osaka Prefecture
1993 births